Garard Green (31 July 1924 – 26 December 2004) was a British actor and commentator.

Green was born in Madras, India in 1924 where his father was superintendent of the government press. When his father died in 1933 the family returned to the United Kingdom and Green finished his education at Watford Grammar School. He developed an interest in acting at Watford but when he left the school he returned to India and the Military Academy and was commissioned into the 2nd King Edward VII's Own Gurkha Rifles (The Sirmoor Rifles).

At the end of the war he was demobilised and won a Sir Alexander Korda scholarship to Royal Academy of Dramatic Art (RADA). On leaving RADA he worked in the theatre in London. In 1953 he married the actress Margaret Tansley. He developed mobility problems caused by severe arthritis which ended his stage career and he concentrated on films and television, appearing in over 40 films including Hour of Decision (1957), Horrors of the Black Museum (1959) and The Hand (1960).

As well as radio work where his talent for voices was in demand, Green recorded nearly 250 audio-books many for the Royal National Institute for the Blind. In 1992 Green compered and narrated a TV spectacular Forty Glorious Years to mark the 40th anniversary of Queen Elizabeth II's accession.

Green died on Boxing Day 2004 aged 80.

Filmography

 Profile (1954)
 High Terrace (1956)
 Morning Call (1957)
 Hour of Decision (1957)
 The Steel Bayonet (1957)
 Crash Drive (1959)
 Horrors of the Black Museum (1959)
 The Flesh and the Fiends (1960)
 The Hand (1960)
 Compelled (1960)
 Sentenced for Life (1960)
 Three Spare Wives (1962)
 The Spanish Sword (1962)
 Emergency (1962)
 A Matter of Choice (1963)

Sources

References

External links
 

1924 births
2004 deaths
Alumni of RADA
British male stage actors
British male voice actors
British male radio actors
British male film actors
Indian Army personnel of World War II
Male actors from Chennai
People educated at Watford Grammar School for Boys
British people in colonial India
Royal Gurkha Rifles officers